James "Jamie" McClure Clarke (June 12, 1917 – April 13, 1999) was a North Carolina politician and farmer. He is a former Democratic member of the United States House of Representatives.

Born in Manchester, Vermont, Clarke grew up in Asheville, North Carolina. Clarke graduated with an A.B. in history from Princeton University in 1939 after completing a 78-page long senior thesis titled "The Princetonian: A History of College Life." He then served as a Lieutenant in the United States Navy during World War II in the Pacific from 1942 to 1945. After his service, Clarke worked as a dairy farmer and orchardist in western North Carolina. He became president of the Farmers Federation Cooperative in 1956.

In 1976, Clarke was elected to the North Carolina House of Representatives as a Democrat. In 1980 he was elected to the North Carolina Senate. In the 1982 election Clarke was elected to the 98th United States Congress representing North Carolina's 11th congressional district. He was reelected to the 100th and 101st Congresses. In Congress, he was known as an advocate for the environment.

In the 1980s Clarke's congressional campaigns became nationally famous due to his long-running rivalry with Republican Bill Hendon. In 1982 Clarke defeated then-Congressman Hendon by less than 1,500 votes. In 1984 Hendon gained revenge by defeating Clarke's bid for a second term by just two percentage points. In 1986, Clarke defeated Hendon's bid for re-election by only one percentage point. Although Hendon then retired from politics, Clarke's seat remained competitive. In 1988 Republican Charles H. Taylor came within one percentage point of defeating Clarke; in 1990 Taylor unseated Clarke in another close election. Given his age (he was 73 at the time of his loss to Taylor), Clarke decided to retire from politics.

References

External links

James McClure Clarke '39, obituary from Princeton Alumni Weekly
 

1917 births
1999 deaths
United States Navy officers
Democratic Party members of the North Carolina House of Representatives
Democratic Party North Carolina state senators
Politicians from Asheville, North Carolina
Princeton University alumni
United States Navy personnel of World War II
Democratic Party members of the United States House of Representatives from North Carolina
20th-century American politicians
School board members in North Carolina
People from Manchester, Vermont